The CONCACAF Gold Cup is North America's major tournament in senior men's football and determines the continental champion. Until 1989, the tournament was known as CONCACAF Championship. It is currently held every two years. From 1996 to 2005, nations from other confederations have regularly joined the tournament as invitees. In earlier editions, the continental championship was held in different countries, but since the inception of the Gold Cup in 1991, the United States are constant hosts or co-hosts.

From 1973 to 1989, the tournament doubled as the confederation's World Cup qualification. CONCACAF's representative team at the FIFA Confederations Cup was decided by a play-off between the winners of the last two tournament editions in 2015 via the CONCACAF Cup, but was then discontinued along with the Confederations Cup.

Since the inaugural tournament in 1963, the Gold Cup was held 26 times and has been won by seven different nations, most often by Mexico (11 titles).

Grenada became a CONCACAF member in 1978 and has since regularly entered the continental championships. They qualified for the final tournament two times, twice in a row in 2009 and 2011. They lost all six matches scoring only one goal, and are ranking last in the all-time table.

Overall record

Match overview

Record by opponent

Record players

Anthony Modeste is the only player who was fielded in all of Grenada's six Gold Cup matches.

Goalscorers

The only Grenadian goal at a Gold Cup was scored by Clive Murray in his only appearance at the tournament. Nineteen minutes into the second group match against Honduras, he hit the crossbar after a cross by Delroy Facey, but converted the rebound to take the lead. Ultimately, Grenada lost the match 1–7.

References

Countries at the CONCACAF Gold Cup
Gold cup